Giacomo Domenico Mario Antonio Pasquale Giuseppe Tritto (2 April 1733 – 16 September 1824) was an Italian composer, known primarily for his fifty-four operas.  He was born in Altamura, and studied in Naples; among his teachers were Nicola Fago, Girolamo Abos, and Pasquale Cafaro. Amongst his pupils were the young Vincenzo Bellini around 1821, plus Ferdinando Orlandi. He died in Naples.

Operas
Le nozze contrastate (opera buffa, 1754, Naples)
La fedeltà in amore (opera buffa, libretto by Francesco Cerlone, 1764, Naples)
Li furbi (intermezzo, 1765, Naples)
Il principe riconosciuto (opera buffa, libretto by Francesco Cerlone, 1780, Naples)
La francese di spirito o La viaggiatrice di spirito (opera buffa, libretto by G. M. Mililotti, 1781, Rome)
La Bellinda o L'ortolana fedele (opera buffa, libretto by Francesco Cerlone, 1781, Naples)
Don Procopio in corte del Pretejanni (opera buffa, 1782, Naples)
Don Papirio (opera buffa, libretto by Giuseppe Palomba, 1782, Naples)
I due gemelli (opera buffa, libretto by Giovanni Battista Lorenzi, 1783, Naples)
Il convitato di pietra (opera semiseria, libretto by Giovanni Battista Lorenzi, 1783, Naples)
La sposa stramba (opera buffa, 1783, Naples)
La scuola degli amanti (opera buffa, libretto by Giuseppe Palomba, 1783, Naples)
La scuffiara (opera buffa, libretto by Giovanni Battista Lorenzi, 1784, Naples)
Il matrimonio negli Elisii ovvero La sposa bizzarra (opera buffa, libretto by Carlo Giuseppe Lanfranchi-Rossi, 1784, Rome)
L'Artenice (opera seria, 1784, Naples)
L'Arminio (opera seria, libretto by Ferdinando Moretti, 1786, Rome)
Le gelosie ovvero I due fratelli burlati (farsetta, 1786, Rome)
Li raggiri scoperti (opera buffa, 1786, Rome)
La vergine del sole (opera seria, libretto by Carlo Giuseppe Lanfranchi-Rossi, 1786, Naples)
Armida (opera seria, 1786, Naples)
Le vicende amorose (dramma giocoso, libretto by Pastor Arcade Timido, 1787, Rome)
La molinara spiritosa (opera buffa, libretto by Francesco Saverio Zini, 1787, Naples)
La bella selvaggia (opera semiseria, 1788, Rome)
La scaltra avventuriera (opera buffa, libretto by Giuseppe Palomba, 1788, Naples)
Il giuocatore fortunato (opera buffa, libretto by Giuseppe Petrosellini, 1788, Naples)
Il finti padroni (farsa, 1789, Rome)
La prova reciproca (L'inganno fortunato ossia La prova reciproca) (opera buffa, libretto by Giuseppe Palomba, 1789, Naples)
I servi padroni (farsetta, 1790, Rome)
La cantarina (opera buffa, libretto by Carlo Goldoni, 1790, Rome)
Il cartesiano fantastico (opera buffa, libretto by Giuseppe Maria Diodati, 1790, Naples)
Le astuzie in amore (opera buffa, libretto by Giuseppe Maria Diodati, 1790, Naples)
L'inganno amoroso (opera buffa, 1790, Madrid)
L'equivoco (opera buffa, libretto by C. Fiori, 1791, Naples)
La creduta selvaggia (farsetta, 1792, Rome)
Gli amici rivali (opera buffa, 1792, Vienna)
Le trame spiritose (commedia, libretto by Giuseppe Palomba, 1792, Naples)
La fedeltà nelle selve (La fedeltà tra le selve) (opera buffa, libretto by Michelangelo Prunetti, 1793, Venice)
Le nozze in garbuglio (opera semiseria, libretto by Giuseppe Maria Diodati, 1793, Naples)
L'ordine del disordine (opera buffa, 1793, Naples)
L'impostore smascherato (opera buffa, libretto by Giuseppe Maria Diodati, 1794, Naples)
Gli amanti in puntiglio (opera buffa, libretto by Giuseppe Maria Diodati, 1794, Naples)
Apelle e Campaspe (opera seria, libretto by Simeone Antonio Sografi, 1795, Milan)
Il barone in angustie (opera buffa, libretto by Giuseppe Palomba, 1797, Naples)
La donna sensibile o sia Gli amanti riuniti (opera buffa, libretto by Domenico Piccinni, 1798, Naples)
La morte di Cesare (opera seria, libretto by Gaetano Sertor, 1798, Brescia)
Micaboro in Jucatan (opera seria, libretto by Domenico Piccinni, 1799, Naples)
I matrimoni in contrasto (opera semiseria, libretto by Giuseppe Ceccherini, 1800, Rome)
Ginevra e Ariodante (opera seria, libretto by Domenico Piccinni, 1801, Naples)
Gli americani (Gonzalvo ossia Gli americani) (opera seria, libretto by Giovanni Schmidt, 1802, Naples)
Cesare in Egitto (opera seria, libretto by Giovanni Schmidt, 1805, Rome)
Lo specchio dei gelosi (opera buffa, 1805, Rome)
Elpinice e Vologeso (opera seria, libretto by Domenico Piccinni, 1806, Rome)
Andromaca e Pirro (opera seria, 1807, Rome)
Marco Albino in Siria (opera seria, 1810, Naples)

References
The references given there were:
Giuseppe de Napoli: La triade melodrammatica altamurana: Giacomo Tritto, Vincenzo Lavigna, Saverio Mercadante (Milan, 1952)
Brandenburg, Daniel: 'Giacomo Tritto: Il convitato di pietra', Napoli e il teatro musicale in Europa tra Sette e Ottocento: studi in onore di Friedrich Lippmann, ed. B.M. Antolini and W. Witzenmann (Florence, 1993, pp. 145–74)

External links
 

1733 births
1824 deaths
Italian classical composers
Italian male classical composers
Italian opera composers
Male opera composers
People from Altamura